Maposa is a village in Central District of Botswana. It is located 15 km north of Nata, and the village has a primary school. The population was 459 in 2001 census. It consists mostly of the KhoeSan tribe and some Bakalaka. It has a clinic, primary school and the kgotla.

People mostly depend in farming and rearing of livestock. It has some of the Big 5 such as an elephant.

References

Populated places in Central District (Botswana)
Villages in Botswana